The discography of South Korean singer-songwriter Yesung, consists of a studio album, four extended plays (EPs), and twelve singles.

Albums

Studio albums

Reissues

Extended plays

Singles

As lead artist

Collaborations

Soundtrack appearances

Other appearances

See also 
 Super Junior discography
 SM the Ballad#Discography
 Super Junior-K.R.Y.#Discography

References 

Discographies of South Korean artists